Ancient Korean institutions

Taesangwang or Taesanghwang (literally "King Emeritus the Great" or "Emperor Emeritus the Great") is the title for a retired king or Korean Emperor in Korean history. Sometimes the term is called Sangwang or Sanghwang.

History
Taejo of Goguryeo called himself "Taejo the Great", who is the first retired king on the Samguk Sagi to retired and abdicated in favour of his son Suseong as a successor.

The last retired emperor as the Taesanghwang was Emperor Gojong in Korean Empire.

List

Goryeo
Chungryeol
Chungseon
Chungsuk

Joseon
Taejo
Jeongjong
Taejong
Danjong
Sejo

Korean Empire
Gojong

See also
Korean nobility
Taishang Huang
Daijō Tennō

Titles in Korea